The Posse Comitatus Act is a United States federal law (original at ) signed on June 18, 1878, by President Rutherford B. Hayes which limits the powers of the federal government in the use of federal military personnel to enforce domestic policies within the United States. Congress passed the Act as an amendment to an army appropriation bill following the end of Reconstruction and updated it in 1956 and 1981.

The Act originally applied only to the United States Army, but a subsequent amendment in 1956 expanded its scope to the United States Air Force. In 2021, the National Defense Authorization Act for Fiscal Year 2022 further expanded the scope of the Act to cover the United States Navy, Marine Corps, and Space Force. The Act does not prevent the Army National Guard or the Air National Guard under state authority from acting in a law enforcement capacity within its home state or in an adjacent state if invited by that state's governor. The United States Coast Guard (under the Department of Homeland Security) is not covered by the Act either, primarily because although it is a armed service, it also has a maritime law enforcement mission.

The title of the Act comes from the legal concept of posse comitatus, the authority under which a county sheriff, or another law officer, can conscript any able-bodied person to assist in keeping the peace.

History
The Act, § 15 of the appropriations bill for the Army for 1879 (found at ) was a response to, and subsequent prohibition of, the military occupation of the former Confederate States by the United States Army during the twelve years of Reconstruction (1865–1877) following the American Civil War (1861–1865).

The U.S. Constitution places primary responsibility for the holding of elections in the hands of the individual states. The maintenance of peace, conduct of orderly elections, and prosecution of unlawful actions are all state responsibilities, according to any state's role of exercising police power and maintaining law and order, whether part of a wider federation or a unitary state. However, in the former Confederate States, many paramilitary groups sought to suppress, often through intimidation and violence, African-American political power and return the South to rule by the predominantly white Democratic Party. Although African Americans were initially supported by the federal government, as Reconstruction went on, that support waned. Following the bitterly disputed 1876 U.S. presidential election and Compromise of 1877, Congressmen and Senators from the former Confederate States returned to Washington and prioritized prohibiting the federal government from reimposing control over their states. After President Hayes used federal troops to end the Great Railroad Strike of 1877, there was sufficient bipartisan support to pass what became the Posse Comitatus Act.

The original Posse Comitatus Act referred exclusively to the United States Army. The Air Force, established during the 20th century initially as a branch of the Army, was added in 1956. The Navy and Marine Corps were not mentioned in the Act but were subject to the same restrictions by Department of Defense regulation until their inclusion in the act in 2021. The Space Force, established in 2020, was also included in the Act in 2021. The United States Coast Guard is not included in the act even though it is part of the six armed services as it is explicitly given federal law enforcement authority on maritime law. The modern Coast Guard did not exist at the time the Act became law in 1878. Its predecessor, the United States Revenue Cutter Service, was primarily a customs enforcement agency and part of the United States Department of the Treasury. In 1915, when the Revenue Cutter Service and the United States Lifesaving Service were amalgamated to form the Coast Guard, the service was both made a military branch and given federal law enforcement authority.

In the mid-20th century, the administration of President Dwight D. Eisenhower used an exception to the Posse Comitatus Act, derived from the Enforcement Acts, to send federal troops into Little Rock, Arkansas, during the 1957 school desegregation crisis. The Arkansas governor had opposed desegregation after the United States Supreme Court ruled in 1954 in the Brown v. Board of Education that segregated public schools were unconstitutional. The Enforcement Acts, among other powers, allowed the president to call up military forces when state authorities were either unable or unwilling to suppress violence that was in opposition to the citizens' constitutional rights.

In the summer of 2020, the George Floyd protests in Washington, D.C. generated controversy when National Guard troops were called in to suppress protests without President Donald Trump's invoking the Insurrection Act (though he threatened to do so). One set of troops, the District of Columbia National Guard, has historically operated as the equivalent of a state militia (under Title 32 of the United States Code) not subject to Posse Comitatus Act restrictions, even though it is a federal entity under the command of the President and the Secretary of the Army. National Guard troops from cooperative states were also called in at the request of federal agencies, some of whom were deputized as police. Attorney General William Barr cited , which says National Guard troops may engage in "support of operations or missions undertaken by the member's unit at the request of the President or Secretary of Defense." Saying the intent of §502 (titled "Required drills and field exercises") was to cover training exercises only, Senator Tom Udall and U.S. Representative Jim McGovern described this as a "loophole" to circumvent Posse Comitatus Act restrictions, and introduced legislation to close it.

In 2020, U.S. Representative Adam Schiff introduced an amendment to the Act to expand its coverage to include the U.S. Navy, Marine Corps, and Space Force. This amendment was eventually included in the 2022 National Defense Authorization Act.

Legislation
The original provision was enacted as Section 15 of chapter 263, of the Acts of the 2nd session of the 45th Congress.

The text of the relevant legislation is as follows:

Also notable is the following provision within Title 10 of the United States Code (which concerns generally the organization and regulation of the armed forces and Department of Defense):

2006–2007 suspension

In 2006, Congress modified the Insurrection Act as part of the 2007 Defense Authorization Bill (repealed as of 2008). On September 26, 2006, President George W. Bush urged Congress to consider revising federal laws so that U.S. armed forces could restore public order and enforce laws in the aftermath of a natural disaster, terrorist attack or incident, or other condition. These changes were included in the John Warner National Defense Authorization Act for Fiscal Year 2007, which was signed into law on October 17, 2006.

Section 1076 is titled "Use of the Armed Forces in major public emergencies". It provided that:

In 2008, these changes in the Insurrection Act of 1807 were repealed in their entirety, reverting to the previous wording of the Insurrection Act. It was initially written to limit presidential power as much as possible in the event of insurrection, rebellion, or lawlessness.

Exclusions and limitations
There are several situations in which the Act does not apply. These include:
 National Guard units, state defense forces, and naval militias while under the authority of the governor of a state. However, when the National Guard is under federal control via , that shifts control from the state governor to the President, making Guard operations subject to the Posse Comitatus Act as well.
 Federal troops used in accordance to the Insurrection Act, which has been invoked 23 times, .
 Under , the Attorney General may request that the Secretary of Defense provide emergency assistance if domestic law enforcement is inadequate to address specific types of threats involving the release of nuclear materials, such as potential use of a nuclear or radiological weapon. Such assistance may be by any personnel under the authority of the Department of Defense, provided such assistance does not adversely affect U.S. military preparedness. The only exemption is the deployment of nuclear materials on the part of the United States Armed Forces.
 Provide surveillance, intelligence gathering, observation, and equipment for domestic law enforcement on operations such as drug interdiction and counter-terrorism missions. For example, Delta Force soldiers from Fort Bragg were deployed upon request by the Federal Bureau of Investigation to serve as sniper/observer teams, run communications, provide medical support, gather intelligence, and conduct assistance in explosive breaching during the 1987 Atlanta prison riots.

Exclusion applicable to U.S. Coast Guard

Although it is an armed service, the U.S. Coast Guard, which operates under the United States Department of Homeland Security during peacetime, is not restricted by the Posse Comitatus Act but has explicit authority to enforce federal law. This is true even when the Coast Guard operates as a service within the United States Navy during wartime.

In December 1981, the Military Cooperation with Civilian Law Enforcement Agencies Act was enacted, clarifying permissible military assistance to domestic law enforcement agencies and the Coast Guard, especially in combating drug smuggling into the United States. Posse Comitatus clarifications emphasize supportive and technical assistance (such as the use of facilities, vessels, and aircraft, as well as intelligence support, technological aid, and surveillance) while generally prohibiting direct participation of U.S. military personnel in law enforcement (such as search, seizure, and arrests). For example, a U.S. Navy vessel may be used to track, follow, and stop a vessel suspected of drug smuggling, but Coast Guard Law Enforcement Detachments (LEDETs) embarked aboard the Navy vessel would perform the actual boarding and, if needed, arrest the suspect vessel's crew.

Advisory and support roles
Federal troops have a long history of domestic roles, including occupying secessionist Southern states during Reconstruction and putting down major urban riots. The Posse Comitatus Act prohibits using active duty personnel to "execute the laws"; however, there is disagreement over whether this language may apply to troops used in an advisory, support, disaster response, or other homeland defense role, as opposed to domestic law enforcement.

On March 10, 2009, members of the U.S. Army Military Police Corps from Fort Rucker were deployed to Samson, Alabama, in response to a shooting spree. Samson officials confirmed that the soldiers assisted in traffic control and securing the crime scene. The governor of Alabama did not request military assistance, nor did President Barack Obama authorize their deployment. Subsequent investigation found that the Posse Comitatus Act was violated and several military members received "administrative actions".

See also
 List of military actions by or within the United States
 Martial law
 Militarization of police
 Separation of military and police roles
 United States Northern Command

References

Further reading 
 Hendell, Garri B. "Domestic Use of the Armed Forces to Maintain Law and Order: posse comitatus Pitfalls at the Inauguration of the 44th President", Publius (2011) 41(2): 336–48 
 Lindorff, David. "Could It Happen Here?". Mother Jones magazine, April 1988.
 The Posse Comitatus Act of 1878: A Documentary History. Buffalo, NY: W.S. Hein, 2003.

External links 

  Use of Army and Air Force as Posse Comitatus
 "The Posse Comitatus Act: A Principle in Need of Renewal", Washington University Law Quarterly, Vol. 75, No. 2
 The Posse Comitatus Act and Related Matters: The Use of the Military to Execute Civilian Law—Congressional Research Service
 Should the Posse Comitatus Act be Changed to Effectively Support Local Law Enforcement?—U.S. Army War College
 John Warner National Defense Authorization Act for Fiscal Year 2007
 Bill Text 112th Congress (2011–2012) S.1867.ES
 Federalist Paper #29 Concerning the Militia, Alexander Hamilton, pub. 10 January 1788

1878 in American law
1878 in the United States
United States federal criminal legislation
United States federal defense and national security legislation
United States military policies